Spačva can refer to:

 Spačva basin, a small geographical region in eastern Croatia
 Spačva (river), a river in the same region of Croatia, affluent of Bosut